John B. ("Jack") Corliss is a scientist who has worked in the fields of geology, oceanography, and the origins of life.

Corliss is a  University of California, San Diego Alumnus, receiving his PhD from Scripps Institution of Oceanography in the 1960s.  As part of his doctoral work under Jerry van Andel, he analyzed samples of basaltic rock from the Mid-Atlantic Ridge.  Chemical traces in these rocks showed evidence of hot water circulation, suggesting the existence of undersea hot springs known as hydrothermal vents.

Following the completion of his PhD, Corliss became a researcher at Oregon State University.  In 1977, Corliss, Richard von Herzen, and Robert Ballard lead a project using the DSV Alvin submersible to look for the presumed hydrothermal vents near the Galápagos Islands. Corliss, Tjeerd van Andel, and pilot Jack Donnelly were the crew of the Alvin to first discover the vents and the unexpected community of living creatures—giant tube worms, clams, shrimp, etc.—around them.

The discovery of the hydrothermal vent ecosystems caused Corliss to significantly shift his research, from geochemistry to the origins of life.  He proposed that the earliest life on Earth began in deep sea vents.  In 1981, he, John Baross, and Sarah Hoffman published a paper entitled "An Hypothesis Concerning the Relationship Between Submarine Hot Springs and the Origin of Life on Earth."  In 1983, he moved to Budapest to continue working independently on this hypothesis.

In 1988, Corliss joined the NASA Goddard Space Flight Center's high-performance computing division. There he began using massively parallel computers (the Goodyear MPP and later MasPar MP-1) for cellular automata simulations of evolutionary systems.

In 1993, he became director of research at Biosphere 2 in Arizona.
He was hired to bring rigor and openness to the project, following conflicts that had resulted in the mass resignation of the project's scientific advisory board.

In 1996, he returned to Budapest to found and direct the Central European University's Center for Complex Adaptive Systems (a.k.a. the Systems Lab).

His daughter Julie Corliss is a well-known science writer.

References

 Ballard, Robert D., 2000, The Eternal Darkness, Princeton University Press.
 Begley, Sharon. "In the Desert, Big Trouble Under Glass", Newsweek, 18 April 1994, p. 54.

American geologists
Living people
Oregon State University faculty
Cellular automatists
Year of birth missing (living people)